Sohail Shaukat Butt (born 1 April 1983) is a Pakistani politician who had been a member of the Provincial Assembly of the Punjab from October 2018 till January 2023. He was also a member of the National Assembly of Pakistan, from June 2013 to May 2018.

Early life
He was born on 1 April 1983.

Political career

Butt ran for the seat of the Provincial Assembly of Punjab as a candidate of Pakistan Muslim League (N) (PML-N) from Constituency PP-158 (Lahore-XXII) in 2008 Pakistani general election, but was unsuccessful. He received 21,696 votes and lost the seat to Malik Ghulam Habib Awan.

He was elected to the National Assembly of Pakistan as a candidate of PML-N from Constituency NA-130 (Lahore-XIII) in 2013 Pakistani general election from the big Rural constituency of Lahore. He defeated Ch Ijaz Dayaal and Samina Khalid Ghurki with Big margin. He received 88,842 votes and defeated Samina Khalid Ghurki. In the same election, he ran for the seat of the Provincial Assembly of Punjab as an independent candidate from Constituency PP-158 (Lahore-XXII), but was unsuccessful. He received 102 votes and lost the seat to Malik Ghulam Habib Awan.

In 2013, it was reported that Butt was granted bail in three murder cases.

In 2017, Butt was booked for his alleged involvement in the murder of a politician affiliated with Pakistan Peoples Party.

He was re-elected to the Provincial Assembly of the Punjab as a candidate of PML-N from Constituency PP-164 (Lahore-XXI) in by-election held on 14 October 2018.

References

Living people
Pakistan Muslim League (N) politicians
Punjabi people
Pakistani MNAs 2013–2018
1983 births